GURPS Robots is a supplement  for GURPS (Generic Universal Role-Playing System). Written by David Pulver, it was published by Steve Jackson Games in 1995.

Contents
GURPS Robots includes rules for players to design robots, and then use them as player characters in a GURPS campaign. Several sample robots are provided for the gamemaster. Although there are no full adventures in the book,  several ideas for campaigns are presented.

Publication history
In the 2014 book Designers & Dragons: The '80s, game historian Shannon Appelcline noted that Steve Jackson Games decided in the early 1990s to stop publishing adventures, and as a result "SJG was now putting out standalone GURPS books rather than the more complex tiered book lines. This included more historical subgenre books. Some, such as GURPS Camelot (1991) and GURPS China (1991), were clearly sub-subgenres, while others like GURPS Old West (1991) and GURPS Middle Ages I (1992) covered genres notably missing before this point."

GURPS Robots is one such standalone book, a 128-page softcover designed by David Pulver, with interior art by Dan Smith and Denis Loubet, and cover art by John Zeleznik. It was published by SJG in 1995 for use with the 3rd edition of GURPS.

Reviews
In the January 1996 edition of Dragon (Issue #225), Rick Swan was highly impressed by this book, calling it a "stunner of a GURPS supplement."  He did warn that the process of robot design "isn't for the faint of heart: designing a complex robot can take up a good chunk of a weekend." However, for players willing to dive in, Swan concluded, "Prepared to be dazzled."

Other reviews
Arcane #19 (May 1997, p.66)
Ringbote #13 (July/August 1997, p.11)

References

Robots
Role-playing game supplements introduced in 1995
Science fiction role-playing game supplements